El Aïn is a town located in the Sfax Governorate, 7 kilometers north of Sfax, Tunisia. Its population in 2004 was 38,250.

References

Populated places in Sfax Governorate
Communes of Tunisia